Þórólfur "Þór" Beck (21 January 1940 – 18 December 1999), also known as Thor Beck and Tottie Beck, was an Icelandic professional footballer who played as a striker.

Biography
Þórólfur was born in Reykjavík, the capital city of Iceland, on 21 January 1940, the son of Eiríkur Þórólfsson Beck (1918–1951) and Rósbjörg Hulda Magnúsdóttir (1919–1981). He had one sister, Guðrún Eiríksdóttir Beck, born in 1941. After his football career ended, Þór returned to live in Reykjavík and died in his home in the city on 18 December 1999, at the age of 59.

Career
Þór began his career in his native Iceland with KR, making his senior debut in 1958. He then played in Scotland with St Mirren and Rangers, before moving to France to play with FC Rouen. Þór later played in the National Professional Soccer League in the United States for the St. Louis Stars during the 1967 season.

After retiring as a player, Þór later coached IBV in his native Iceland.

References

1940 births
1999 deaths
Thor Beck
Association football forwards
Thor Beck
Thor Beck
Thor Beck
St Mirren F.C. players
Rangers F.C. players
FC Rouen players
Ligue 1 players
Scottish Football League players
Thor Beck
Expatriate footballers in Scotland
Expatriate footballers in France
Expatriate soccer players in the United States
Thor Beck
Thor Beck
St. Louis Stars (soccer) players
National Professional Soccer League (1967) players
Icelandic expatriate sportspeople in France
Icelandic expatriate sportspeople in Scotland
Icelandic expatriate sportspeople in the United States
Thor Beck